Sean Whyte (born October 23, 1985) is a professional Canadian football placekicker for the BC Lions of the Canadian Football League (CFL).

Amateur career
Whyte played college football for the Santa Monica Corsairs and Canadian Junior College Football for the Big Kahuna Rams. He finished his junior eligibility with the Rams in 2007 where he was also named to the All-Canadian Offensive Team as a placekicker.

Professional career

BC Lions
Whyte was signed by the BC Lions as a territorial exemption on May 29, 2007, where he practiced regularly with the team throughout the season. Later that year, he signed a three-year contract to remain with the Lions. In 2008, he spent the year on the practice roster.

In 2009, following an injury to incumbent Lions kicker, Paul McCallum, Whyte played in his first professional game on July 16, 2009, against the Edmonton Eskimos, where he made his only field goal attempt of 23 yards and made all five of his extra point conversions. He played in 11 regular season games, making 21 of 29 field goal attempts and punting 70 times with a 41.7-yard average before the kicking duties were given back to McCallum in October that year.

Whyte returned to the Lions in 2010 as the backup kicker and saw little game action due to McCallum's strong play. Whyte played in only two regular season games where he made all six of his field goal attempts and punted 15 times for a 40.1-yard average.

Montreal Alouettes
Whyte was traded to the Montreal Alouettes on the 2011 draft day on May 8, 2011, after the Lions drafted punter Hugh O'Neill. He won the kicking job following training camp and connected on 45 of 52 field goal attempts and punted 115 times for a 41.3-yard average throughout all 18 regular season games in 2011. Following his strong season, he won the East Division's Most Outstanding Canadian Award.

Whyte continued to play well for the Alouettes as he connected on 80.5% of his field goal attempts in 2012 and 82.0% in 2013, where he was named a Division All-Star for the first time in his career. He had his best season as an Alouette in 2014 when he made 41 of 47 field goal attempts for an 87.2% completion rate and had a career-high punting average of 44.9 yards. Despite his excellent season, Whyte fell out of favour with the Alouettes in 2015 as the team opted to dress rookie Boris Bede as the team's kicker due to his stronger leg. Whyte spent the first six games on the reserve roster behind Bede, who performed well enough for Whyte to be released on August 10, 2015.

Edmonton Eskimos / Elks
On September 4, 2015, it was announced that Whyte had signed with the Edmonton Eskimos, after the team's incumbent kicker, Grant Shaw had been injured. He played in the team's final nine games of the regular season where he made 24 out of 26 field goal attempts. He also served as the team's punter for his first six games with the team until Shaw returned from injury. After the team finished first in the West and won the West Final, where Whyte made all three of his field goal attempts, he played in his first career Grey Cup game in 2015. Despite making just one of his three field goal attempts, the Eskimos prevailed and defeated the Ottawa Redblacks by a score of 26–20 in the 103rd Grey Cup game and Whyte won his first championship.

In his second year with the Eskimos, Whyte had his best season as he made 45 of 48 field goal attempts for a 93.8% completion rate, which was the third-best completion percentage in CFL history, at the time. However, he was not awarded All-Star status due to Justin Medlock kicking a CFL-record 60 field goals that year. After suffering an injury in 2017 that caused him to miss 12 games, he returned in 2018 where he made 36 of 40 field goal attempts.

In 2019, he was the unanimous selection for the Eskimos' Most Outstanding Special Teams Player. He signed a contract extension through the 2021 season with the team on December 31, 2020. He became a free agent upon the expiry of his contract on February 8, 2022.

BC Lions (II)
On the first day of free agency, on February 8, 2022, Whyte signed with the BC Lions. After wearing number 6 with the Alouettes and Elks, he opted to return to wearing number 10, his old number with the Lions and the same number as one of his favourite hockey players, Pavel Bure.

Personal life
Whyte was born to parents Pat and Tom and has two siblings, Jeff and Jennifer.

References

External links
BC Lions bio

1985 births
Living people
BC Lions players
Canadian football placekickers
Canadian Junior Football League players
Edmonton Elks players
Montreal Alouettes players
People from White Rock, British Columbia
Players of Canadian football from British Columbia
Santa Monica Corsairs football players